Pied Piper Malone is a 1924 American silent comedy drama film directed by Alfred E. Green and starring Thomas Meighan. The Famous Players-Lasky produced the film and Paramount Pictures distributed.

Plot
As described in a film magazine review, sailor Jack Malone and Charles Crosby, second mate of the steamer Langland, are in love with Patty Thomas of Oldport. Crosby gets drunk on duty and Jack is promoted in his place by Captain Clarke. The Langland gets into serious difficulties during a storm and sinks while the crew escape in boats. Crosby reaches Oldport first and accuses the Captain and Jack of being intoxicated and causing the disaster. All the town folk, including Patty, believe him. However, in the end, Jack Malone's name is cleared by the children of the town, who know Jack as the "Pied Piper." Jack also wins back Patty.

Cast

Preservation
A print is reportedly held at Gosfilmofond, in Moscow.

References

External links

Australian daybill long poster
Accessible version of Australian poster
American lobby poster

1924 films
American silent feature films
Films directed by Alfred E. Green
Paramount Pictures films
1924 comedy-drama films
1920s English-language films
American black-and-white films
1920s rediscovered films
Rediscovered American films
1920s American films
Silent American comedy-drama films